Admiral John William Brackenbury, CB, CMG (30 November 1842 – 15 March 1918) was a Royal Navy officer.

The son of Vice-Admiral William Congreve Cutliffe Brackenbury, John William Brackenbury joined the Royal Navy in 1857. He was promoted to lieutenant in 1865, commander in 1876, and captain in 1881. He led a naval brigade during the Anglo-Zulu War of 1879 and was appointed CMG for his services. He also served during the Anglo-Egyptian War of 1882, receiving the Khedive's Bronze Star and the Order of the Medjidie, Third Class. He was appointed a CB in 1887 on the occasion of Queen Victoria's Golden Jubilee. He was appointed to the command of the corvette HMS Turquoise the same year.

References 

Royal Navy personnel of the Anglo-Egyptian War
Companions of the Order of the Bath
Companions of the Order of St Michael and St George
Royal Navy admirals
Royal Navy personnel of the Anglo-Zulu War
Recipients of the Order of the Medjidie, 3rd class
1842 births
1918 deaths